Anthony "Boots" Martinez (born 15 July 1963) is a Belizean politician. A member of the United Democratic Party, Martinez was first elected to the Belize House of Representatives from the Southside Belize City-based Port Loyola constituency in 2003 after an unsuccessful 1998 campaign. He served as Minister of Public Works from 2008 to 2012 under Prime Minister Dean Barrow. After the UDP government was re-elected in 2012 Martinez became Minister of Human Development, Social Transformation and Poverty Alleviation.

Martinez was the 1999 UDP nominee for Mayor of Belize City, but was defeated by David Fonseca of the People's United Party. Martinez is also known to have several houses and estate in Belize. 

Martinez will stand down from the Belize House at the next general election.

References

1963 births
Living people
United Democratic Party (Belize) politicians
Government ministers of Belize
Members of the Belize House of Representatives for Port Loyola